Deutscher Musikpreis is a German music prize, awarded since 1979 by the . The prize is currently 12,500 euros.

Winners 
 1982 RIAS Jugendorchester
 1985 Peter Maffay
 1989 Richard Jakoby
 1993 Die Prinzen
 1997 
 2000 Rolf Zuckowski
 2004 Udo Jürgens
 2008 Bundesjugendorchester
 2012 Dieter Thomas Heck

References 

1979 establishments in West Germany
Awards established in 1979
German music awards